Boyarin may refer to:

Russian cruiser Boyarin (1901), a light cruiser built for the Imperial Russian Navy
Daniel Boyarin (born 1946), Jewish-American historian of religion

See also
Boyar

Russian-language surnames